Colonel William Pinney (4 July 1806 – 30 May 1898) was a British Liberal and Whig politician, and military officer.

Born in Somerton, Somerset, Pinney was the son of John Frederick Pinney and Frances née Dickinson, the daughter of William Dickinson. He died unmarried.

Pinney was first elected Whig MP for Lyme Regis at the 1832 general election and held the seat until 1842 when he was unseated due to bribery, treating, and other corrupt practices by himself, and his agents, friends and parties.

He returned to Parliament for East Somerset at a 1847 by-election—caused by the death of William Gore-Langton—and held the seat until 1852, when he stood down to successfully contest Lyme Regis again. He then held this seat until 1865, when he stood down.

In 1868, Pinney stood for East Somerset once more, but ended bottom of the poll out of four candidates.

Pinney was also Colonel of the 2nd Somerset Militia from 18 January 1850.

References

External links
 

Liberal Party (UK) MPs for English constituencies
Whig (British political party) MPs for English constituencies
UK MPs 1832–1835
UK MPs 1835–1837
UK MPs 1837–1841
UK MPs 1841–1847
UK MPs 1847–1852
UK MPs 1852–1857
UK MPs 1857–1859
UK MPs 1859–1865
Somerset Militia officers
1806 births
1898 deaths